The Ponce Metropolitan Statistical Area is a United States Census Bureau defined Metropolitan Statistical Area (MSA) in south central Puerto Rico. A 1 July 2009 Census Bureau estimate placed the population at 262,414, a 0.95% decrease from the 2000 census figure of 264,919.

Ponce is the third largest metropolitan area (by population) in Puerto Rico. Of the eight MSA areas in the Commonwealth, only Ponce and Mayagüez experienced population declines during the 2000-2009 period.

Municipalities
A total of three municipalities (Spanish: municipios) are included as part of the Ponce Metropolitan Statistical Area.  They are:

Juana Díaz
Ponce—Principal City
Villalba

Combined Statistical Area

The Ponce–Yauco–Coamo Combined Statistical Area (CSA) includes two metropolitan areas, two micropolitan areas; nine municipalities in total. A July 1, 2009 Census Bureau estimate placed the population at 483,149, a 2.07% increase over the 2000 census figure of 442,244. The Ponce–Yauco–Coamo Combined Statistical Area comprises 12.2% of Puerto Rico's total population.

Components
Metropolitan Statistical Areas (MSAs)
Ponce (3 Municipalities)
Yauco (4 Municipalities)
Micropolitan Statistical Areas (μSAs)
Coamo (1 Municipality)
Santa Isabel (1 Municipality)

See also
Puerto Rico census statistical areas

References

 
Metropolitan areas of Puerto Rico